Tracy Eisser (born November 20, 1989) is an American rower who was selected to compete as part of the United States team at the 2016 Summer Olympics. She won the gold medal in the quad sculls at the 2015 World Rowing Championships.

Eisser grew up in Fair Lawn, New Jersey and attended Fair Lawn High School, where she competed in the high jump and long jump. She graduated from Cornell University in 2012.

References

External links
Tracy Eisser at USRowing

1989 births
Living people
American female rowers
Cornell University alumni
Fair Lawn High School alumni
People from Fair Lawn, New Jersey
Sportspeople from Bergen County, New Jersey
World Rowing Championships medalists for the United States
Rowers at the 2016 Summer Olympics
Rowers at the 2020 Summer Olympics
Olympic rowers of the United States
Cornell Big Red rowers
21st-century American women